This is a list of Tensou Sentai Goseiger episodes. Each episode is referred to as an "epic".

Episodes


{| class="wikitable" width="98%"
|- style="border-bottom:8px solid #87CEFA"
! width="4%" | Epic # !! Title !! Writer !! Original airdate
|-|colspan="4" bgcolor="#e6e9ff"|

The Gosei Angels Descend

|-|colspan="4" bgcolor="#e6e9ff"|

The Fantastic Goseigers

|-|colspan="4" bgcolor="#e6e9ff"|

Landick Power Divided

|-|colspan="4" bgcolor="#e6e9ff"|

Play the Angel's Song

|-|colspan="4" bgcolor="#e6e9ff"|

Magical Hyde

|-|colspan="4" bgcolor="#e6e9ff"|

The Breakout Goseigers

|-|colspan="4" bgcolor="#e6e9ff"|

Protect the Land!

|-|colspan="4" bgcolor="#e6e9ff"|

Out of Control Gosei Power

|-|colspan="4" bgcolor="#e6e9ff"|

Gotcha☆Gosei Girls

|-|colspan="4" bgcolor="#e6e9ff"|

Hyde's Partner

|-|colspan="4" bgcolor="#e6e9ff"|

Spark, Landick Power

|-|colspan="4" bgcolor="#e6e9ff"|

The Miraculous Gosei Headder Great Assembly

|-|colspan="4" bgcolor="#e6e9ff"|

Run! The Mystic Runner

|-|colspan="4" bgcolor="#e6e9ff"|

Birth of the Ultimate Tag Team!

|-|colspan="4" bgcolor="#e6e9ff"|

Countdown! The Life of the Earth

|-|colspan="4" bgcolor="#e6e9ff"|

Dynamic Alata

|-|colspan="4" bgcolor="#e6e9ff"|

A New Enemy! The Yuumajuu

|-|colspan="4" bgcolor="#e6e9ff"|

The Earth Purifying Knight of Destiny

|-|colspan="4" bgcolor="#e6e9ff"|

Gosei Knight Will Not Allow It

|-|colspan="4" bgcolor="#e6e9ff"|

Fall In Love Goseigers

|-|colspan="4" bgcolor="#e6e9ff"|

Elegant Eri

|-|colspan="4" bgcolor="#e6e9ff"|

Over the Rainbow

|-|colspan="4" bgcolor="#e6e9ff"|

Burn! Goseigers

|-|colspan="4" bgcolor="#e6e9ff"|

The Miracle Attack Goseigers

|-|colspan="4" bgcolor="#e6e9ff"|

Nostalgic Moune

|-|colspan="4" bgcolor="#e6e9ff"|

The Laughing Gosei Angels

|-|colspan="4" bgcolor="#e6e9ff"|

Wake Up Agri!

|-|colspan="4" bgcolor="#e6e9ff"|

A Father's Treasure

|-|colspan="4" bgcolor="#e6e9ff"|

The Goseigers are Sealed!

|-|colspan="4" bgcolor="#e6e9ff"|

Romantic Eri

|-|colspan="4" bgcolor="#e6e9ff"|

Never Give Up, Goseigers!

|-|colspan="4" bgcolor="#e6e9ff"|

Perform the Ultimate Miracle!

|-|colspan="4" bgcolor="#e6e9ff"|

The Dreadful Matrintis Empire

|-|colspan="4" bgcolor="#e6e9ff"|

Gosei Knight Justice

|-|colspan="4" bgcolor="#e6e9ff"|

Find the Perfect Leader!

|-|colspan="4" bgcolor="#e6e9ff"|

Run, Agri!

|-|colspan="4" bgcolor="#e6e9ff"|

Excited Moune

|-|colspan="4" bgcolor="#e6e9ff"|

Alice vs. Gosei Knight

|-|colspan="4" bgcolor="#e6e9ff"|

Epic Zero

|-|colspan="4" bgcolor="#e6e9ff"|

Strong Alata

|-|colspan="4" bgcolor="#e6e9ff"|

Exploding Bonds of Friendship!

|-|colspan="4" bgcolor="#e6e9ff"|

Passionate Hyde

|-|colspan="4" bgcolor="#e6e9ff"|

The Empire's All-Out Attack

|-|colspan="4" bgcolor="#e6e9ff"|

The Ultimate Final Battle

|-|colspan="4" bgcolor="#e6e9ff"|

The Messiah is Born

|-|colspan="4" bgcolor="#e6e9ff"|

Gosei Knight is Targeted

|-|colspan="4" bgcolor="#e6e9ff"|

The Trap of the Earth Salvation Plan

|-|colspan="4" bgcolor="#e6e9ff"|

The Fighting Gosei Power

|-|colspan="4" bgcolor="#e6e9ff"|

Fight Towards the Future

|-|colspan="4" bgcolor="#e6e9ff"|

Protecting the Planet is an Angel's Mission

|}

References

See also

Tensou Sentai Goseiger

ja:天装戦隊ゴセイジャー#放映リスト